Rosa Maltoni (married Mussolini; 22 April 1858 – 19 February 1905) was the mother of Italian Fascist founder and leader Benito Mussolini, the mother of Arnaldo and Edvige Mussolini, the mother-in-law of Rachele Mussolini and the paternal grandmother of Bruno Mussolini, Edda Mussolini, Romano Mussolini, and Vittorio Mussolini. Maltoni was a nominal Catholic schoolteacher who married the socialist Alessandro Mussolini against the wishes of her father. After Benito, Rosa had three more children, Arnaldo, Laura, and Edvige. She died of meningitis in 1905 when her son, Benito Mussolini, was only 22.

Mussolini was reportedly very attached to his mother, and during the Fascist period, Rosa came to represent the ideal Italian woman. On June 17, 1930, a ceremony was held to honor her as a "great educator and glorious mother."

References

Italian Fascism
19th-century Italian people
1858 births
1905 deaths
Italian Roman Catholics
Deaths from meningitis
Infectious disease deaths in Emilia-Romagna
Neurological disease deaths in Emilia-Romagna
Mussolini family
Italian schoolteachers